Pakruostė (formerly) is a village in Kėdainiai district municipality, in Kaunas County, in central Lithuania. According to the 2011 census, the village has a population of 23 people. It is located 3 km from Surviliškis, 2 km from Lažai, by the rivers of Kruostas II and Liepupis. There is a wooden cross made by local crossmaker Vincas Svirskis.

Pakruostė manor is known since 1596.

Demography

Images

References

Villages in Kaunas County
Kėdainiai District Municipality